Rebutia albopectinata is a species of Rebutia from Bolivia.

References

External links
 
 

albopectinata
Cacti of South America
Endemic flora of Bolivia